is a New Zealand rugby union player who plays as a fullback.

References

External links

New Zealand rugby union players
Living people
Rugby union fullbacks
New Zealand expatriate sportspeople in Japan
Sunwolves players
1997 births
Rugby union fly-halves
Rugby union centres
Rugby union wings
Otago rugby union players
Highlanders (rugby union) players